Sanabesi (  सानाबेसी  ) is a Village of Mirkot village development committee in Gorkha District in the Gandaki Zone of northern-central Nepal. Sanabesi lies in Ward no. 8 in Mirkot VDC.

References

Populated places in Gorkha District

pl:Bhirkot (Gorkha)